Tenea is a municipal unit within the municipality of Corinth, Corinthia, Peloponnese, Greece. Until 2011, it was a municipality whose seat was in Chiliomodi.

The modern city is named after ancient Tenea, established approximately  SE of Corinth and  NE of Mycenae shortly after the Trojan War. According to Pausanias, Tenea's founders were Trojan prisoners of war whom Agamemnon had allowed to build their own town. The name Tenea is styled upon Tenedos, the founders' home town, whose mythological eponym was the hero Tenes. Tenea and Rome, according to Virgil's Aeneid, had in the years following the Trojan War produced citizens of Trojan ancestry. Under the leadership of Archias in 734 or 733 BC, Teneans and Corinthians established the joint colony of Syracuse in Sicily, the homeland of Archimedes.

History
Strabo mentions Tenea:
{| class="toccolours" style="margin-left: 1em; margin-right: 2em; font-size: 95%; background:#c6dbf7; color:black; width:40em; max-width: 40%;" cellspacing="5"
| style="text-align: left;" |
Tenea, also, is in Korinthia, and in it is a temple of the Apollon Teneatos; and it is said that most of the colonists who accompanied Archias, the leader of the colonists to Syracuse, set out from there, and that afterwards Tenea prospered more than the other settlements, and finally even had a government of its own, and, revolting from the Corinthians, joined the Romans, and endured after the destruction of Corinth... And it is said that Polybos raised Oedipus here. And it seems, also, that there is a kinship between the peoples of Tenedos and Tenea, through Tennes the son of Kyknos, as Aristotle says; and the similarity in the worship of Apollon among the two peoples affords strong indications of such kinship.
|-
| style="text-align: left;" | Strabo, (8.6.22)
|}
as does Pausanias:

Tenea was the most important place in ancient Corinthia after the city of Corinth and its port towns; it was situated 60 stadia south of Corinth, according to Pausanias, hence the southern gate of Corinth was called the Teneatic. Stephanus of Byzantium describes Tenea as lying between Corinth and Mycenae. Pausanias says that the Teneatae claimed descent from the inhabitants of Tenedos, who were brought over from Troy as prisoners, and settled by Agamemnon in this part of Corinthia; and that it was in consequence of their Trojan origin that they worshipped Apollo above all the other gods. Strabo also mentions here the temple of Apollo Teneates, and says that Tenea and Tenedos had a common origin in Tennes, the son of Cycnus. It was at Tenea that Oedipus was said to have passed his childhood. It was also from this place that Archias took the greater number of the colonists with whom he founded Syracuse. After the destruction of Corinth by Lucius Mummius Achaicus, Tenea had the good fortune to continue undisturbed, because it is said to have assisted the Romans against Corinth. We cannot, however, suppose that an insignificant place like Tenea could have acted in opposition to Corinth and the Achaean League; and it is more probable that the Teneatae were spared by Mummius in consequence of their pretended Trojan descent and consequent affinity with the Romans themselves.

Archaeological findings
Ruins of ancient Tenea are one kilometre south of Chiliomodi. Some archaeological finds are housed in the Archaeological Museum of Ancient Corinth. The most famous find, the Kouros of Tenea (c. 550 BC), found near Athikia in 1846, is in the Munich Glyptothek. It is a great example of 6th century BC Greek sculpture and of the so-called Aeginetean or archaic smile.

In 1984, archaeologists discovered a sarcophagus of the Greek early archaic period containing the skeletal remains of what had been a high-society woman along with offerings.

In 2013, archaeologists surveyed a site in the area and, encouraged by pottery and other small finds, began excavating. They said that “The concentration of ceramics and architectural remains… were the reasons that led us to the excavation of the site,” In 2017, they found a trove of riches while digging up what had been a dual-chambered burial ground at the Tenea site. In 2018, they found “proof of the existence of the ancient city” of Tenea led by Elena Korka near the village of Chiliomodi. An image of the excavation site depicts stone walls, clay and marble floors, about 200 rare coins, the remains of what were probably houses from the settlement. During the excavation, seven burials with vases and jewelry were revealed dating to the Roman and Hellenistic periods. Besides, skeletons of a woman and an infant were found. According to Elena Korka, Tenea’s cutting coins was the indicator of its complete independence.

Subdivisions
The municipal unit Tenea is subdivided into the following communities (constituent villages in brackets):
Agionori
Agios Vasileios
Chiliomodi
Klenia
Koutalas (Koutalas, Mapsos, Spathovouni)
Stefani

Historical population

See also

List of traditional Greek place names

References

External links
Kouros of Tenea
Apollo of Tenea
Municipality of Tenea
Strabo, Book 8
Gallery and description [in Greek] of monuments in and around Tenea.
 Korka, Eleni; Lefantzis, Michalis; Corso, Antonio. Archaeological Discoveries from Tenea. Actual Problems of Theory and History of Art: Collection of articles. Vol. 9.'' Ed: A. V. Zakharova, S. V. Maltseva, E. Iu. Staniukovich-Denisova. Lomonosov Moscow State University / St. Petersburg: NP-Print, 2019, pp. 172–179. ISSN 2312-2129

 
Populated places in ancient Corinthia
Former populated places in Greece
Cities in ancient Peloponnese
Locations in Greek mythology
Populated places in Corinthia
Populated places established in the 2nd millennium BC
Trojan colonies
Greek city-states